Gita Johar has served as Senior Vice Dean and is currently the Meyer Feldberg Professor of Business at Columbia Business School, Columbia University. She is known for her research in the field of Consumer behavior, particularly in the area of consumer inference making in advertising and communication. In 2006, she was appointed the Meyer Feldberg Professor of Business at Columbia Business School. Johar has been the Vice Dean for Research at Columbia Business School, and the Vice Dean for Diversity, Equity and Inclusion.

Academic career
Johar is a graduate of IIM Calcutta. In her doctoral thesis at the Stern School of Business, New York University, Johar focused on the role of consumer involvement in drawing false inferences from advertisements (deceptive advertising). She joined Columbia University in 1992, received tenure in 2000, became a full professor in 2002 and was appointed the Meyer Feldberg Professor of Marketing (a named chair) in 2006.

Johar currently serves as the President of the Society for Consumer Psychology.

Research
Much of Professor Johar's research deals with the way people interpret messages and on how attributes of the source and characteristics of the message can affect the way a recipient interprets the message. In one series of studies, she shows that people with baby-faces (rounder facial characteristics) are considered to be more honest while people with mature faces are considered to be more competent. This research has implications in a variety of situations, from companies in crisis to the messages of presidential candidates.

References

Columbia Business School faculty
Living people
Indian Institute of Management Calcutta alumni
New York University Stern School of Business alumni
Year of birth missing (living people)